Risen is an action role-playing game franchise, developed by the German company Piranha Bytes. It is published and distributed by the German company Deep Silver, a division of Koch Media.

The franchise is close to the three first episodes of the Gothic franchise, also developed by Piranha Bytes.

Games 
The games in the Risen franchise are:
 Risen (2009)
 Risen 2: Dark Waters (2012)
 Risen 3: Titan Lords (2014)

Risen 

 Developer: Piranha Bytes
 Publisher: Deep Silver, THQ Nordic
 Platform: Microsoft Windows, Xbox 360, PlayStation 4, Xbox One, Nintendo Switch
 Release Date: October 2, 2009 (international version) 24 January 2023 (PlayStation 4, Xbox One, Nintendo Switch) 
 Graphic Engine: Internal development by Piranha Bytes

The audio of the international version is multilingual: German, English and French. More than 200,000 copies of the first game were sold in Germany.

Risen 2: Dark Waters 

 Developer: Piranha Bytes
 Publisher: Deep Silver
 Platform: Microsoft Windows, PlayStation 3, Xbox 360
 Release Date: April 27, 2012
 Graphic Engine: Internal development by Piranha Bytes

Risen 3: Titan Lords 

 Developer: Piranha Bytes
 Publisher: Deep Silver
 Platform: Microsoft Windows, PlayStation 3, PlayStation 4, Xbox 360
 Release Date: August 12, 2014
 Graphic Engine: Internal development by Piranha Bytes

See also
Gothic, a similar franchise by the same developer.

References

External links 
   Piranha Bytes web site
   Communauté francophone de la série Gothic/Risen

Video game franchises
Video game franchises introduced in 2009
Embracer Group franchises